"All I Can Think About Is You" is a song by British rock band Coldplay from Kaleidoscope EP (2017). It was released ahead of the extended play on 15 June 2017, following "Hypnotised" and preceding "Aliens". The track was composed by all four members of the band and produced by Dan Green along with Rik Simpson. A lyric video directed by I Saw John First came out on the same day.

Critical reception
Colin Stutz of Billboard magazine wrote: "The understated song rides on a rolling bassline and steady rhythm with light guitar licks that mesmerize as they build to a soaring climax." He also noted that the lyric video is "equally trippy" as the track. Anna Gaca of Spin magazine called the song "unusually shoegaze-y". Andrew Pollard of Redbrick said that the song "feels like a celebration of their [Coldplay] distinct sound and musical past rather than a lazy rehash". Ben Kaye of Consequence of Sound said that the song has "a psychedelic dream of jammy guitars and gentle percussion". Muzikalia placed the track on their unranked "Best Songs of 2017" list.

Track listing

Credits and personnel
Credits adapted from Tidal.

Coldplay
 Chris Martin – lead vocals, piano, keyboard
 Jonny Buckland – electric guitar
 Guy Berryman – bass guitar
 Will Champion – drums, programming

Additional musicians
 Daniel Green – producing, keyboard
 Rik Simpson – producing, keyboard, background vocals, mixing, programming

Technical personnel
 Chris Allgood – mastering engineering
 Emily Lazar – mastering engineering
 Robin Baynton – engineering
 Aleks Von Korff – engineering
 Bill Rahko – engineering
 Tom Bailey – engineering
 Anthony De Souza – assistant engineering
 Laurence Anslow – assistant engineering
 Andrew Rugg – assistant engineering
 Owen Butcher – assistant engineering

Charts

References

2017 songs
Coldplay songs
Parlophone singles
Song recordings produced by Rik Simpson
Songs written by Chris Martin
Songs written by Guy Berryman
Songs written by Jonny Buckland
Songs written by Will Champion